Big Spring is an unincorporated community located in the town of New Haven, Adams County, Wisconsin, United States.

Notable people
Alonzo L. Best, Wisconsin State Representative, farmer, and teacher, was born in Big Spring.
Sophronius S. Landt, Wisconsin State Representative, lived in Big Spring.
Una R. Winter, suffragist, was born in Big Spring.

References

Unincorporated communities in Adams County, Wisconsin
Unincorporated communities in Wisconsin